Svojek is a municipality and village in Semily District in the Liberec Region of the Czech Republic. It has about 200 inhabitants.

Administrative parts
The village of Tample is an administrative part of Svojek.

References

Villages in Semily District